Mohammad Shams (born 1954 in Tehran) is an Iranian composer and conductor. Born in a family of musicians, he has composed more than 650 pieces of traditional, classical and modern music.

Despite the troubles an artist in exile must face, Shams found ways to introduce Classical Persian music in international events such as the London Festival in England.

He describes his music as being attached to poetry and to the roots of Persian music. His style is described ample and accurate, paying attention to tones and sounds, to contrasts and to orchestral material full of expression.

Shams has said about Persian music: "To me, music has to bring love, harmony, pleasure, happiness, but also rhythm and movement. Our music is so-called sad. It is not. When talking about classical music, I mean it has to keep its nature, but also evolve with time".

External links
  Official website of Mohammad Shams
 His biography

1954 births
Living people
Iranian composers
Iranian conductors (music)
People's Mojahedin Organization of Iran members
21st-century conductors (music)
Iranian music arrangers